Rapid Finance is a technology-powered financial services company that provides working capital to small and mid-sized businesses in the United States. As a sister company of Rocket Mortgage, it offers small and medium business loan programs for business owners in a variety of industries and categories. With over US$1 billion funded, it is the 4th largest online small business lender in the United States. The company claims that no single business category accounts for more than 25% of its revenues.

History 
The company was founded in 2005 and headquartered in Bethesda, Maryland. It was acquired by Dan Gilbert's Rockbridge Growth Equity, LLC in 2013. It is part of Rock Family of Companies that include the Cleveland Cavaliers, Fathead, Rocket Mortgage and Genius. The company went through a rebrand in 2019, changing its name to Rapid Finance following its expansion and diversification of loan products.

A publication from The Washington Post found Rapid Finance to be among the best in the Washington D.C. area from 2016 to 2019. The Detroit Free Press also found Rapid Finance to hold the #1 ranking for Michigan's Top Small Workplaces in 2016. Consumers Advocate ranked Rapid Finance as the third best small business loan provider.

References

External links
 Rapid Finance — Official Website

Financial services companies established in 2005
Financial services companies based in Maryland
Rock Ventures
Loans